Rezat may refer to:

Fränkische Rezat, a river in Bavaria, Germany
Schwäbische Rezat, a river in Bavaria, Germany